Joan Dant (1631–1715) was an English pedlar. Born in Spitalfields, in the East End of London, she married a weaver. Upon her husband's premature death, she was forced to become a pedlar, selling goods to fellow Quakers in the environs of London. Thanks to her frugality and good business sense, she became a rich merchant, leaving  in her will when she died in 1715. Dant is now regarded as one of the few female entrepreneurs trading before the [confusing

Life 

There are few details concerning Dant's early life. She was born in 1631, in Spitalfields, in the East End of London, and married a weaver.

Upon the early death of her husband, Dant was forced to become a pedlar in order to survive. Carrying products on her back, she sold haberdashery, hosiery and mercery, mostly in the countryside around London. She was an upright Quaker and therefore could sell to fellow 
Friends. Her business increased and since she remained frugal, Dant had enough money to start trading for goods from abroad, becoming a successful merchant. By 1711, she had been invited to join the monthly Women's Meetings of Quakers in London.

Dant died in 1715, aged 84. She gave some of her savings away to the London Yearly Meeting of Quakers and its poorer attendees, saying "I got it by the rich and I mean to leave it to the poor".

Dant was buried at a Quaker cemetery at Bunhill Fields in London.

Legacy 
According to the Oxford Dictionary of National Biography, Dant is regarded as "a rare example of a female capitalist from before the Industrial Revolution." Having given £110 to the poor and £1800 to Quaker organisations, she set up a fund to help poor Friends, which was still giving out grants of under  to deserving individuals in 1844.

References 

1631 births
1715 deaths
People from Spitalfields
17th-century Quakers
18th-century Quakers
Merchants from London
17th-century English merchants
17th-century English businesswomen
Burials at Bunhill Fields
18th-century English businesswomen
18th-century English businesspeople